Häggenås SK is a sports club in Häggenås, Sweden, established on 2 January 1932.

In 1951, the table tennis section was started.

The women's soccer team was started in 1972, and played three seasons in the Swedish top division between 1978–1980.

References

External links
Häggenås SK 

Basketball teams in Sweden
Table tennis clubs in Sweden
Football clubs in Jämtland County
Ski clubs in Sweden
Sports clubs established in 1932
Athletics clubs in Sweden
1932 establishments in Sweden
Sport in Jämtland County